The Devil's Toy is a 1916 American silent drama film directed by Harley Knoles and starring Adele Blood, Edwin Stevens and Montagu Love.

Cast
 Adele Blood as Helen Danvier
 Edwin Stevens as The Devil
 Montagu Love as Wilfred Barsley
 John Halliday as Paul La France 
 Madge Evans as Betty
 Arnold Lucy as Simon Cunningale

References

Bibliography
 Langman, Larry. American Film Cycles: The Silent Era. Greenwood Publishing, 1998.

External links
 

1916 films
1916 drama films
1910s English-language films
American silent feature films
Silent American drama films
American black-and-white films
Films directed by Harley Knoles
World Film Company films
1910s American films